The Kolkata International Film Festival (KIFF) is an annual film festival held in Kolkata, India. Founded in 1995, it is the third oldest international film festival in India. The festival is organized by the West Bengal Film Centre under the West Bengal Government. In 2019, it was held from 8 November to 15 November.

Duration will be not less than 60 minutes for featured films. The length of short films must be not more than 30 minutes, and for documentaries not more than 60 minutes. Productions may not be older than two years and must be an Indian premiere.

Awards ceremonies
The following is a listing of all Kolkata International Film Awards ceremonies since 1995.

See also

 26th Kolkata International Film Festival
 28th Kolkata International Film Festival

References

External links
 
 

 
Film festivals in India
1995 establishments in West Bengal
Culture of Kolkata
Film festivals established in 1995
Indian film festivals
Events in Kolkata